This is the list of both known major and minor characters for the animated television series Di-Gata Defenders. Some of them have magical abilities.

Main Six Defenders

Seth
At the age of fourteen, Seth is the leader of the Di-Gata defenders. He is skilled, confident, charismatic, creative, and decisive. However, he is also impatient in battle and headstrong. He also likes to eat, which he can do with his eyes closed, and tends to succumb to nausea more than the others due to his weak stomach.  He controls the Nova Stone, a powerful Champion Stone which once belonged to his father.

As the leader of the Defenders, he tries to be careful with those he trusts, for the past errors they have had (especially with Kali). 
 
Seth goes through the most physical changes than any character in the series. At one point, an attack by Omniaxor (his father's guardian) caused Seth to merge with his guardian Kragus. This merge offered Seth superhuman strength and armour against various attacks plus a powerful roar that shook his surroundings, but this caused him to get easily angered. Later, the merge took a drastic effect on his physical appearance, as his right arm, chest and sometimes his face took up the rock that his guardian had. Eventually, he was separated from Kragus at the hands of a Megalith-possessed woman. But to preserve Kragus' spirit, Omniaxor offers himself to allow Kragus to go to his guardian stone, causing Omniaxor to merge with Kragus to form OmniKragg. He later falls ill from his right hand due to a stone Lady K’Tahsh implanted in it.  To remove the stone and save the Defenders, Brackus had to take the chance of sacrificing Seth's hand using Devastation of Infinis, destroying it and the stone in the process.

The aftermath causes him to have a robotic arm installed by Erik. But it wasn't completed and the Infinimatter that wasn't contained began to corrupt Seth's way of thinking. He made a pact with Doku and almost destroyed the city of Arboth. He manages to save Arboth by giving up the energy to re-create his arm to restore Arboth to normal. To recompensate for what he has done, Seth decided to quit the Di-Gata Defenders temporarily. After dealing with Aaron and with encouragement from Rion, Seth realized that it was wrong to have quit the Defenders and they needed him more than ever. Seth decides to rejoin as their leader. He received a better mech arm which could transform into an arm cannon to fire his attack and could even direct the missiles with a gauntlet.

After the Defenders managed to save their Dojo's power core from being destroyed by Kali, Seth re-gains the power to merge with Omnikrag, to increase his physical power. However, this time he can release from this transformation at will.

Seth specialises in the Dako and Nega sigils, and his spells commonly involve dark energy attacks. His first Guardian, Kragus, was a rock-based giant that can also absorb rock into its own body and copy its properties. His current guardian is OmniKragg; a by-product of a merge between Seth's Kragus and his father's guardian, Omniaxor. He even got a disk that once belonged to Aaron that seemed to be a key to a history book.  Again, he got merged with his guardian a second time.

Seth is voiced by Noah Cappe.

Melosa
14-year-old Mel is a young Wizard of Yan  and second in command of the Di-Gata Defenders. She is patient and level-headed in battle. She is also well-read given the years sequestered in the dojo library.

Her Wizard of Yan heritage gives her access to special powers, which allows her to cast spells without using Di-Gata stones as a casting medium. But she didn't gain total suppression and control of them until "Replication", because of the Megalith energy that was contained in the Dako Pure Stone. The Vitus sigil and the Megalith powers that corrupted her in "One Down" caused frequent wizard attacks. These attacks caused her to randomly send out bursts of energy or cast Wizard Spells (random Sigils summoned without physical Di-Gata stones) without her knowing it.

She is the only current Defender to have witnessed first hand the final battle between the Ethos and the Wizards of Yan, as she had gone back in time with a staff that Kor Yin-an gave to her. At the time, Nazmul was his human self, the Order of Infinis was not formed and their key members were allied with the Wizards, and the Armies of Yin were warriors that fought for RaDos. Melosa didn't realize at first who was allied with who and accidentally froze the Celestial Abyss the first time (but it was overheated, which kind of helped the situation). She later helps them reclaim the Celestial Abyss from the Ethos, which was then used to banish the Ethos to the Dark Realm. Before leaving, Melosa's grandmother gave her the stones the Defenders use in the future to track the Five Icons (The pieces of the Celestial Abyss).

After the Defenders managed to save their Dojo's power core from being destroyed by Kali, Melosa has the power to merge with Draykor, to increase her powers with ice and fly. She can release from this transformation at will.

Mel is close to finding out Brackus is working for the Ethos in Mel On My Mind as he told her about K'Tahsh coming to the Dojo to claim the icons. Mel questions him about how he knows and he says that 'There are things you need to know about me...and Lady K'Tahsh.' It always shows that he and K'Tahsh have a past together. This is confirmed in Complications when Mel is looking in Brackus' tent she finds a locket with a picture of a younger Brackus and a woman who looks like Lady K'Tahsh before she was possessed by the Ethos named Torash. This shows that Mel is the only one who knows about Brackus and K'Tahsh being in love in the past.

Mel specializes in the Yan and Sum sigils like her mother Freya and her attacks are generally ice-based. Her Guardian is Draykor. Melosa keeps her Guardian's spirit in a special, one of a kind, spell-amulet she wears around her neck. The amulet is an heirloom received from her grandmother. She also allowed her to use the Tracker Stones for the Celestial Abyss to form a gladiator spear, helmet and shield, which she uses to force Kor Yin-an to escape. Melosa bears a resemblance to Storm from the X-Men of Marvel Comics.

Mel is voiced by Martha MacIsaac.

Kara
Twelve years old, Kara is the youngest girl of the Defenders, the most powerful, and considered by the others to be the least skilled. Kara is very strong-willed and determined. The others (especially her big brother, Erik) always feel the need to protect her, but in fact she is more than capable of taking care of herself.

Kara has to wear a pair of cybernetic boots made by Erik, for she cannot walk without them.  When she was younger, she found Erik's stones on the ground and played with them. She cast them by accident, which led to a miscast. The attack was most likely a forge fire with a Yan sigil instead of an Infinis sigil. (It was shown on "The Di-Gata Redemption.") The result was her legs were burned. She wasn't able to walk again until the boots were invented for her. The boots are both an asset and liability to Kara, since they allow her to jump great heights and give her greater balance, but are vulnerable to various types of electronic interference. Beneath her boots, she wears stockings that resemble jika-tabi.

Kara's body is ideal for channelling Sigil energies and absorbing large amounts of power. This was discovered by King Magnun and revealed to the Defenders by Flinch. Because of this ability, Nazmul wishes to use her body as a host for his power. This power was exploited to defeat Sari, and later, the Megalith.

When she got sent to the Dark Realm at the hands of a Zad, she meets the banished Brackus. She forms a temporary alliance so she can escape, because he knows where the location of the portal will be. She manages to escape after foreseeing Brackus' treachery. After escaping the Dark Realm, Alnar sends Kara away for special training to combat the Ethos. She no longer travels with the other defenders, as Rion now takes her place. It was hinted at the beginning of Season 2 that Kara seems to have developed romantic feelings for Rion as he saved her from the Dark Realm, with both their eyes half closed, thanking him for saving her life, and her comforting him after fighting the Rath-Marak. It was also shown in Absolution that Rion seemed to care the most about Kara after her sacrifice (apart from Erik) and even went to great lengths as to transforming into his dark half and attacking Adam, for not trying to protect her.

She later steals the Orb of Ogama-Yan from Malco, undetected (as she was wearing the same invisibility cloak that Adam wears). She also helps Melosa restore her powers after Kor Yin-an drained a portion of her powers.
 
Kara comes to the Defender's dojo after Seth quits the Defenders. She is intent on recovering the pieces of the Celestial Abyss before Malco does. However, her behaviour is different around them. First, she has no intention to finding their former leader Seth and returning him to the fold. Second, she has no strong reactions to Brackus' healer personality, even though he tricked her at the Tower of No-Ah and the past endeavors with him. Finally, her physical strength has increased (she is able to lift Seth) and her spells shifted towards the Black Arts. After realizing she couldn't get anywhere with the Defenders because they were too concentrated in getting Seth back, she sneaks into the Dojo's shield generator. She then says she has no need for the others as she could find the remaining icon pieces by herself. She then shuts down the shield generator to the dojo, revealing to the Zad raiding party where the Defenders were hiding.

She manages to defeat the Zad single-handedly, with the power of Vanathos and her Black Devourer spell. She is also working as a spy for a dark and mysterious agency. Because of Kara's mission, this agency seems to want the Ethos eliminated just as much as the Defenders, but their motives or members are still unclear. Brackus is the only one that knows Kara is a spy for them, as he was eavesdropping on one of her conversations. However, it is soon revealed that she was actually captured by Kali's people and Kali was sent in her place to retrieve the Tome of Al-Mortigar. She was saved before it was handed over.

In The Di-Gata Redemption, the Defenders faced a creature from another realm, which like Kara, had the power to absorb energy to make itself stronger. Because Erik was the only one to master the two lost sigils. He was able to use their power to drain its energy. However, Erik's body couldn't withstand the energy drain, especially since the creature had previously absorbed the power of the Nova Stone. Kara stepped in and helped conduct the energy from him into her. However, it was also too much for Kara to handle. She had no choice but to destroy her physical body, and send the excess energy, along with her spirit into Alnar's Life Stone.

Soon, Erik went to great lengths to bring back his sister. Accompanied by a small furry animal, who was actually Kara's spirit in disguise, he comes to a monument where he had to face trials to revive her. But what seemed to be her physical form begged him to move on and continue in his duty as a Defender. After getting angry at Adam, Erik soon accepts Kara's death and moves on. Unknown to him, Kara's spirit is still watching over him.

Kara specializes in the Altas and Yin sigils, and her spells were wind and electricity based.  Her Guardian is V-Moth.

According to a forum on www.digata.com, Kara's mother is Jelena, who may or may not be a defender.
 
Kara is voiced by Sugar Lyn Beard.

Erik

At age fourteen (since "Trouble in Paradise") Erik is a skilled strategist. He can always seem to find a way around any attack. He is the technological thinker and has a good head for designing and building electronic gizmos. He tends to speak in technical jargon when he works on technology. (He was called Mr. Science by Seth in "The Lost Children" when he was setting up the sensors). But when he speaks, not many people are able to understand him. He is the only person who maintains the mechanical components of the Sigil Stormers, the Defender's main form of transportation. He also built Seth's robotic arm, when his hand was destroyed by Brackus, and the boots for Kara as recompense for not being able to stop the accident that paralyzed her.

He is the one of the six stone-casters that has an external device to use Di-Gata stones. And like Flinch, he is the "comic relief" character for the show. Because he frequently overdramatizes situations, wants to do things in a challenging fashion, and sometimes shows extreme cowardice. He often screams in a high-pitched girlish tone. He is also overprotective to his sister, Kara.

When the Tome of Al-Mortigar was destroyed by accident (it was shot when they tried to steal it), the Defenders sought out Brim. Brim then used a spell on Erik to transfer the knowledge the book contained over to him, giving him the memories of the Master Carver. He is the only character besides Brim who has full knowledge of the first two Sigils contained within the Tome.

Erik was later arrested for getting involved with the destruction of the Tomb of Al-Mortigar. He is taken to prison where he has a vision of where the third icon is hidden.  He finds out that there are people working for the Ethos to locate the third icon, so he searches for where it could be hidden.  His prison roommate is a Wizard of Yan. At first Erik doesn't believe him because he must have been crazy or something later realizes he is one for real. Together they are able to locate the third icon, but unfortunately, it is guarded by a creature from another realm. His roommate is destroyed by the monster when it is released, leaving Mel the last Wizard of Yan. It was also able to kill the Ethos spy with ease. Erik is able to drain the energy of the beast by using Mal-ra and Orn-ra (the two lost sigils). The energy was too much for him to handle though, and Kara ends up diverting the excess energy from Erik to herself. But like the previous person before Erik that tried to seal this creature using Mal-ra and Orn-ra, Kara sacrificed her physical body, and her spirit lives inside the Life Stone.

Erik specializes in the Infinis and Ogama sigils, and his attacks are fire and machine based. His Guardian is Robotus. He is also the only character besides Brim who has knowledge of the two lost sigils, Mal-ra and Orn-ra.

Erik is voiced by Dan Petronijevic.

Rion

At twelve years old, Rion is a mysterious and inexperienced white-haired Defender. He is the youngest boy of the Defenders and he was to be trained as a secret "weapon" to help the Defenders defeat the Ethos, although he himself was half-Ethos. He lived at a dojo with Tzur, a giant rock golem creature who was preparing him for combating the Ethos. However, his training was cut short when the Megalith was released and destroyed. After he met the Defenders, he travelled with them.

His inexperience has granted him consequences. His first time he tried to help (which was the defenders VS Zad), he ended up causing more damage than help to the Defenders, and almost got dragged into the Dark Realm with Kara. However, with help from Spider-Robotus, that fate was prevented. However, he is slowly learning how to control himself and the use of his Di-Gata energy. He currently replaces Kara in the main travelling party while she is off training.

He also holds a dark secret. When he succumbs to rage, the rocks on his headband start connecting themselves to his body. Two become rock Katar (कटार), and another forms as a buckle on his cape. His power multiplies and he becomes a dark incarnate of himself. He cannot cast stone spells in this form, but his multiplied energy allows him to take down enemies with his arms. The power is enough to vaporize a single Zad in a matter of seconds. Afterwards, he reverts to his human form and his body becomes fatigued. Malco believes that this power may be useful to the Ethos and the destruction of the Defenders. Brackus theorizes that the Ethos have something to do with his transformations, which proved to be true, as the Rion is later revealed to be the experiment to create warriors through use of Ethos essence but the project was deemed a failure.

It is also discovered that he has the natural ability to calm guardian creatures and speak their ancient language, which is over thousands of years old.

He currently is the only one that is able to trust Brackus as the healer at first glance. And he is also the only one who cares for him or offers him food. His actions have caused arguments between him and Seth, since Seth believes that some foul play is happening with Brackus. The only proof they have against Brackus is what he did to Seth's arm, but Seth takes full responsibility for it, as he says he asked him to, but Rion doesn't believe it. And when Kara was still alive they would flirt back and forth with each other.

After the Defenders managed to save their Dojo's power core from being destroyed by Kali, Rion gains the power to merge with Arvengus, to increase his powers. He can release from this transformation at will.

His guardian is Arvengus, which was given to him by Tzur. He specializes in Yin and Nega sigils, and his spells consist mostly of natural elements like silver and rock.
 
Rion is voiced by Alexander Conti.

Adam

16-year-old Adam is the lost Defender (referred to as the "Lost One" according to Leizel) and the foster son of Brackus. His real parents were killed by Brackus without him knowing about it. He spent his childhood living with Brackus. But Brackus was busy making a world for him, and didn't really spend time with him. He also didn't treat him like a loving father should be. Adam eventually ran away and became a thief. This gives some extra skills, such as hacking and hand-to-hand combat. His background with the Order later gives him knowledge about the Yin-tos Army and other mercenary groups, which comes in handy at times. One example was when Brackus tried to trick the Defenders ("Perfect Host") by giving the Yin-tos a big pep talk, mentioning they wouldn't make it there for two days. Adam remembers that Brackus would not normally do that, and deduces that Brackus wanted the Defenders to hear the speech. He turns out to be right as the army had beaten them to the Spell Zone first. The experiences he has with Brackus makes him much less trusting of him when Brackus supposedly loses his memory, as when he learns of it, he states he still doesn't care.

He is a mystery to his friends and enemies. He meets the Defenders under suspicious circumstances and joins the group on their quest for short periods. However, it's impossible to tell where Adam's true loyalties lie. Although he prefers to fast-talk and barter his way out of a duel, it doesn't mean he's not a skilled stone caster when he has to be, and has been capable of fighting without the use of stones since he was a small boy.

His origin as a Defender is in fact hinted at early on in the first season. When on the run from Kid Cole's gang, he and the others take refuge in a Defender dojo. Cole's gang is unable to enter because their "Sigil Signatures" are not on the list of those who can, but Adam is able to enter with no trouble.

A vast majority of the deeds he does for the Defenders involve treason. Some are more heinous than the others. His most devious act involved handing Kara and the three Pure stones over to Brackus in hopes he could recover the Nova Stone from Brackus and the Ogama Pure Stones from Nazmul, as well as the other Pure Stones; while he did succeed, Kara almost ended up getting killed in the process.

In the aftermath of the destruction of the Megalith and the closing of the Dark Realm portal, Adam decides to take a vacation. He takes the place of healer in a large desert city. His career ended when Seth had a Champion stone fused to his hand. He assisted his friends in saving Mel from the golem Atagor-Atm and the spirit of his deceased wife.

He then helped Doku bring a floating Wizard Tower to Arboth. The Di-Gata stones of Arboth were used to power a machine that would heal wounds and injuries, even re-create missing body parts. He only helped Doku so that this technology could be beneficial for Seth to recover his lost hand. He then officially joins the Defenders as their sixth member.

When Erik is thrown into prison, he makes Adam promise to look out for Kara and make sure nothing happens to her. Adam also promises Kara that they would get Erik out no matter what. However, during the battle with the Rath-Marak, Adam refuses help from Kara when he is pinned under a heavy chunk of stone, and tells her to help Erik instead. After Kara dies doing so, Rion blames Adam for her demise, and is so enraged that he transforms and attacks him. Adam flees, sporting a bad injury on his left arm. After taking care of his wound, Adam sets off to find Erik in hopes of getting him to tell the others that Kara's demise wasn't his fault. But Erik is even angrier than Rion, also saying that Adam knew nothing about duty, that he always abandoned the Defenders whenever they really needed him. Adam explains that at first he didn't care about the good of the Realm, but that changed after being around them. He tells Erik that together, all five of them would make Kara's sacrifice count. However, he temporarily leaves the Defenders on a quest to find out what happened to his real parents. The result of this quest is never elaborated on.

He returns in Di-Gata Dawn to aid his fellow defenders in the final battle with the Ethos. Adam follows the others to the dark citadel and has Seth and Erik distract Rion as he removes the restraining signal from Rion causing the Ethos spirit inside him to be destroyed. Eventually, Rion is able to destroy Ethos and bring peace to Rados.

Adam specialises in the Yin, Yan, and Infinis sigils, and his spells entail traps and stealth-based combat. Adam also carries a retractable staff and is apparently the only Defender trained in non-stone-based combat. Additionally, he bears a cloak, which allows him to make himself nearly invisible. He sometimes casts with his left hand as well as his right, suggesting that he may be ambidextrous. His Guardian is Firefox.

Adam is voiced by Jeremy From.

Allies

The Healer (Brackus)

In "The Healer", Brackus escapes the Dark Realm, but suffers from amnesia. He has no memory of his days with the Order of Infinis or how he escaped from the Dark Realm. He employs himself as the mysterious healer that Doku talks about. He carries a stone with a new sigil engraved on it. He can use it for healing, like he did to cure Seth of the Festering Maggots and the baby. Or as a weapon, which he used to save the Defenders from Abborantus. Rion is the only person who trusts Brackus in his healer persona, while the rest of the Defenders don't because of his past. More recently, the deal he had with Si'i. He had commissioned him to create a guardian that could rival the power of the Defenders and destroy them.

He later regains his memories after claiming Darkviper from Cole, a twisted version of Anaconduit, but he hides them from the Defenders. He saves Seth from being pulled in by the guardian creature that was guarding Brim. He also tried to use his Aqua Stones to stop Malco and Flinch's boat from getting away, but fails and makes it worse. When they reach the mountains, he abandons the Defenders under an avalanche to confront with Malco and Flinch. He reveals his true colors to only them, saying that he wants to become RaDos' Supreme Overlord by destroying Nazmul in his weakened state. He ends up almost sacrificing his life by grabbing the Nova Stone, sealing away its power so Nazmul couldn't feed off it. Which allowed Seth to deliver the final blow before Rion had his power drained. When battling Atagor-atm, Seth told Brackus to remove the stone in his hand forcefully. Brackus takes the opportunity to use Devastation of Infinis on him, turning Seth's hand to stone. He later assists the Defenders in stopping Doku and his tower. He battles Doku and escapes when the tower was destroyed by Seth. He is the only one that knows that Kali disguised herself as Kara to bring the Tome of Al-Mortigar to her people, for he eavesdropped on her during one of her transmissions.

However, Brackus has a larger scheme in play, as the Defenders have no knowledge of this. He has made a secret alliance with Flinch, involving sabotage of the Ethos's plans. Brackus has plans of using the Sigil Slayers that Flinch has been breeding to have an army of creatures at his commands. This is done by mixing spell crystals with the Sigil Slayer's diet. Possibly to be used against not only the Ethos, but the Defenders themselves.

He is also training children to be "Defenders". At first it was in the Dojo with Roodu and Azura, but he eventually harbored extras when Maia came to visit. Because of the events that transpired when the Ethos spirit was stolen from the vault, they were thrown out of the Dojo until things return the normal. He then took advantage of them to retrieve the four Celestial Abyss Icons from the sunken Prime Radosian starship. Unfortunately, he was mortally wounded by Malco and left for dead. Found by the Defenders, Brakus hallucinated Seth as Adam and pleaded him to end his suffering, which Seth obliged. As Brakus died, his young charges assumed that Seth had murdered him and ran off.

Brakus also has a secret pact with Lady K'tahsh's Ethos spirit. He is willing to offer it more suitable host in exchange for K'tahsh herself (as he was in love with her before she was possessed, many years ago). If everything plays out as Brakus foresees, he and K'tahsh would assert themselves as the rulers of RaDos.

Brakus specializes in the Dako and Infinis sigils and his spells involved delivering poisons and painful effects. His guardian was once Anaconduit, a Cobra-like snake; however, he now uses Darkviper, a larger, more twisted version of Anaconduit.

Brakus is voiced by Juan Chioran.

Professor Alnar
Alnar is the old mentor of the young Defenders. He is the brother of the evil Nazmul, but unlike his brother, Alnar is kind and caring. He is sometimes seen by Mel, but only at great times of need.  At those times, Alnar is invisible to others. Alnar teaches Mel about the power of the Wizards of Yan, which at the time she had little control of. Alnar was also responsible for the creation of the city of Arboth.

Alnar was the one who appointed the current Di-Gata Defenders with the task of finding the four Pure Stones, and to recast the Spell of Binding. But with the quest for the Pure Stones completed, he now aids his wisdom in helping the Defenders in stopping the Ethos.

Like some professors, he often doesn't teach them everything they need to know when they need it. The Defenders have left this opportunity pass so they can learn things themselves, and some things have led them to question the mission or jeopardize it.

Alnar's spirit resides in a Di-Gata stone known as the Life stone. This stone is bound to the Altas sigil and needs to be attached to a projector device of some kind before Alnar can appear.

Alnar is voiced by Maurice Dean Wint.

Antagonists

Lord Nazmul
Once a loyal Wizard of Yan, Lord Nazmul fought for the forces of good alongside his brother, Alnar, against the Ethos. But greed, corruption, and the promise of eternal life clouded his mind of all reason. He betrayed his calling by forming the evil Order Of Infinis. His goal is to gain access to enough realm energy to complete a powerful spell that would offer eternal life to him and his followers. Using knowledge from the Ethos and a large portion of the realm's power, he created the Megalith. But before he could use the Megalith's power to suppress RaDos, his first body was destroyed by the Defenders. However, his spirit lives on within a body that has the head like a skull attached to a robotic body. Although Nazmul is still powerful, this body was deteriorating, and he needed to find someone who can hold incredible power - someone like a Defender (i.e. Kara), to be his new host body.

After being maimed by Seth and Omniaxor, he combined his spirit with Malco, to form a being of incomprehensible physical and magical strength. With this superhuman body and power, he banished Brackus to the Dark Realm for high treason. Seth then used the Nova Stone's secondary function (The Nova Prison) and sealed Nazmul's spirit away inside the Nova Stone.

As of the end of Season 1, Nazmul's spirit was still imprisoned inside the Nova Stone. Malco and Flinch couldn't figure out how to free him from the confines of the Nova Stone, until they kidnapped Brim. They go to the Bi'Yani Mountains to retrieve a crystal that has the power to shatter the Nova Stone. Using the crystal and a special hammer, Brim cracks the Nova Stone to free the Lord of Infinis. However, Brim added a failsafe to prevent him from escaping unless someone offered their life energy and took his place. At first, Malco tried to use Brim, but the sigil carver accidentally lost his balance and fell off the cliff. Malco then tried to use Flinch, but Brackus' intervention caused him to drop him. Malco then offered himself to Nazmul and he drained most of Malco's strength.

Nazmul was able to walk, but was weak. He had the appearance of a true skeleton and had red eyes. He then tried to regenerate his energies from the Nova Stone and Rion. But Brackus cut off the Nova Stone source by removing it from the pedestal, almost risking his life. And Seth cut off Nazmul's arm again with Nega Mass, causing him to drop Rion. Without any source of energy to keep him in RaDos, Nazmul's spirit was permanently destroyed.

Nazmul was extremely dangerous as he is one of the very few beings who controlled the Altas sigil by specializing in all Eight original Power Sigils. His wizard spells involve dispelling energy from Di-Gata Stones and firing green beams of light to grab objects and to attack enemies. Nazmul's guardian was the Megalith, who was trapped by a spell in the four Pure Stones. However, it was later destroyed.

Nazmul is voiced by Lawrence Bayne.

Brackus
Brackus was the commander of the Yin-Tos army, who were allied to the Wizards of Yan in the Battle of Yan-Suma. Back then, him and the army were valiant warriors that fought to the end for RaDos. He had Flinch build the Celestial Abyss, a superweapon used to combat the Ethos. After reclaiming the weapon from the Ethos, he used it against them, and sealed them away in the Dark Realm. He later breaks his alliance with the Wizards and joins the Order of Infinis, taking the Yin-Tos army with him.

Brackus later became the chief adviser to Lord Nazmul, which he usurped from Doku. He had his own intentions inside the Order of Infinis. He felt the quest for eternal life was fruitless and the Order could take over RaDos with the power it already has. His real goal was to retake the Megalith and try to master it, so he could be the true ruler. He rarely got his hands dirty, he mostly sent Malco and Flinch or the Yin-Tos Army to do the dirty work for him. However, he is a powerful stone-caster when he arose to the occasion. As time went on, Nazmul began to see his treachery, due to his own intentions and second-guessing his master's orders.

After a shameful defeat in "What Lies Beneath" in which he tried to take Arboth, he was handed over information about the "trump card" he needed to defeat Nazmul: the Nova Stone. He paid a visit to Brim and forced him to spill the beans on the stone's whereabouts. In Callisto, he snatched the Nova Stone from Seth after lashing him with Blazing Pyre of Dako. Seth couldn't retaliate because his stone energy was depleted from a previous cast of the Warrior Henge. He also forced Leizel's wand to activate, banishing her from the mortal realm to the Dark Realm. After Sari knocked him off the cliff in Callisto, he returned to his room with the Nova Stone in hand using the teleporter system he has.

After escaping from Adam's last ploy, he fully declared high treason against Nazmul's order. As one last attempt to regain the Pure Stones from the Defenders, he used an old teleporter system from the Bakorian Cycle to set up an ambush. Flinch, who feels it was wrong to obey Nazmul begs to Brackus for alliance once more. When Brackus said he couldn't be trusted, Malco (who was with Flinch at the time) spoke English for the first time. But then Brackus found out that Malco wasn't who he was by the sound of his new voice. Nazmul, inside Malco's body banished Brackus by igniting his body with Spirits of Dako.

Brackus was then sent to the Dark Realm but didn't become a wraith like the others banished there. He wandered the plains alone, evading the wraiths until Kara was captured and sent there. He later figures out where the Tower of Nowa is, which is where Kara needs to go to hopefully escape from the Dark Realm. However, because he wants freedom himself, he won't tell Kara where it is. Kara decides to form a temporary truce so they both can escape. However, he later attempts to betray Kara but she bested him, leaving him to the wrath of the Leizel and the wraiths. He survives, but at the sacrifice of his right eye, which is now red and has a scar. He is later released and became the healer.

Brackus specializes in the Dako and Infinis sigils and his spells involved delivering poisons and painful effects. His guardian was once Anaconduit, a Cobra like snake; however, he now uses Darkviper, a larger, more twisted version of Anaconduit.

Brakus is voiced by Juan Chioran.

Flinch
Flinch is a brilliant scientist and inventor. He prefers to work alone, but is often sent out on missions because no one else can work out how to use his machines and gizmos. He is a smart-alec with a sharp wit and a quick tongue. However, when it comes to physical confrontation you'll see a different side of him - his backside - as he runs away in terror! Flinch often teams up with his complete opposite Malco, to form a villainous but often bumbling evil duo.

Before the timeline, he invented the Celestial Abyss that the Wizards used to banish the Ethos from RaDos. Back then, he appeared the same except he wore glasses.

Like Brackus, he mostly had his own intentions in mind. For loyalty, he seems to find himself in a point where he has to choose which master he must follow. Disobeying the other often led to dire consequences. He was often threatened by others to do things he doesn't want to do. Seth and Malco were the biggest abuser during these situations. But when the order fell apart, Flinch was free from obedience and he declared himself as his "own man". However, he is seen again with Malco in Dark Equinox Part I.

He travels with Malco, figuring out a way to free Nazmul from the confines of the Nova Stone, and he gets news of Brim, who has been imprisoned. He captures him after the Defenders battle the prison guard. He later takes him to a mountain where a crystal that can break open the Nova Stone lies. He forces him to break it open and also to become the host body for Nazmul, but fails and runs off after the Defenders and Brackus intervene. When he returns, he finds Malco, resurrected by Ethos as their emissary and is forced to work for them.

As of the episode "The Horn of Neglos", he is a double agent to Brackus. Lady K'Tahsh is the only member of the Ethos that knows of this treachery, as she was spying on Flinch during one of their communications (Flinch thought that she was still sleeping after he drugged her water).

Flinch specializes in the Yin and Infinis sigils, and his attacks generally involve terrorizing his enemies with spirits, ghosts, and grotesque monsters. His guardian is Dreadcrow, a scarecrow-like Guardian.

Flinch is voiced by Ron Rubin.

Malco
Once a powerful Di-Gata Defender, Malco was in constant pursuit of perfection. He was a strong-willed warrior, with a shield of rock that can protect him from many attacks. But during the sieges of Yan-Suma, he was mortally wounded and petrified by the Ethos as he helped Nazmul and Brackus reclaim the Celestial Abyss. Nazmul used his Wizard powers to bring him back to life. His contempt of his peers eventually led to the rift that saw him change sides and join Nazmul's growing army as a blind follower of the Order.

Malco has the appearance of an Orc-like human, and he carries large rock weights on his back and forearms. His build is extremely muscular and enormous (being the largest human being on the show). The result of his first resurrection and Nazmul's sorcery, his shield stones bonded with him, giving his body the defensive strength of ten shield stones. He also doesn't lose his offensive power in both physical and magical while his shields are bonded. However, he lacked the power of speech and intelligence. And was easily provoked. He worked with Flinch to overcome these weaknesses, to form a powerful, but bumbling evil duo.

Due to his immense size and power, Malco didn't use a Guardian. As far as he is concerned a Guardian is a crutch for weak casters. He prefers to go head-to-head with the biggest and toughest of Guardians, even if he has to do hand-to-hand combat with them. He is often victorious in doing so.

Later, his spirit was sacrificed to allow Nazmul to merge with him. This created a being of incomprehensible power in both physical strength, armor (the shields), and spiritual power. However, Seth was able to separate his body from Nazmul using the Nova Stone's other power (Nova Prison). Malco was believed to have died (as seen falling into a pit), but this idea proved false when the Defenders were following Rion to his home. He and Flinch follow them and manage to steal the Nova Stone, in hopes of freeing Nazmul. He tried casting it and anything else to free his master but had no success, until they acquired Brim.

After freeing Nazmul, he offers himself to become the host body for Nazmul after being denied Flinch and Brim. Nazmul saps most of his physical strength and throws Malco off the cliff. He is found by the Ethos Emissaries, as he still has life within him. The Ethos Emissaries take control of him, restoring his power and giving him the ability to speak, but making him tainted in color, gain corrupted power, and the sigil designs on his body are now purple. He took the Orb of Ogama-Yan to find the Five icons, to restore the Celestial Abyss, which can open another portal to the Dark Realm. When Malco was trying to control Si'i he was knocked out cold and the Ethos emissaries were able to stop him and say that once they have control over Rados they will have no use for Malco. Malco then very weak walks over to Flinch and tells him that the Ethos are controlling him before the Ethos regain control of him. At the series finale, Malco finally managed to expel the Ethos and for his defiance, they killed him.

Malco specializes in Yin and Dako sigils, and his spells are all about powerful attacks which range from dark flames to meteors to a swarm of locusts. He has no Guardian.

Malco is voiced by Martin Roach.

Lady K'Tahsh
A servant of the Ethos who was formerly a Yin-Tos princess named Torash. Torash was the love interest (and possibly fiancé) of the warlord Brackus, but when the Ethos War came to Yin-Tos, it was believed that Torash was killed by the Ethos. Instead, the Ethos possessed her, turning her into Lady K'Tahsh.

As the Dark lady, she was used by both the Ethos and the Order of Infinis at different times in her life. She was a Radosian that ended up becoming possessed with an Ethos spirit in Yin-tos. She does not use Di-Gata stones in battle, rather a large array of melee weapons to combat foes. These weapons are magical and she can use their enchantments as spells. She is also one of the few characters that can take on the Defenders solo, with little resistance.

Her first task was to collect the first icon to the Celestial Abyss. She ends up successfully stealing it and leaving the Defenders with the Desecrator. She also awakens the Ethos spirit inside of Von Faustien, to turn him over to the Ethos. Erik frees him from its control, but K'tahsh escapes.

Her second task was to gain control of Si'i, the human guardian hybrid. She first asked Aaron for assistance for finding him, but Aaron was defeated by Seth and Rion. She later takes the matter into her own hands. After the accident in Lydia's vehicle, she kidnapped Melosa and brought her to a tribal village. Si'i lives near their village and they plan to use Melosa to flush out Si'i either as bait or a sacrifice.

At various points between these objectives, she appears every once in a while to attack the Defenders to cause troubles or retrieve the Icons for Malco, later Brackus.

She is the only one who knows of Flinch's alliance with Brackus when he drugs her water, overhearing a conversation between the two while Flinch thought she was unconscious. She doesn't do anything with him as they are both allied with Brackus. Before she was possessed, she had a relationship with Brackus. Brackus owns a locket with a picture of the two of them inside of it before her possession.

She eventually starts to lose Malcos trust because of suspicions of her loyalties to Brackus and that she is constantly failing the Ethos cause.

In "Nightfall" she has Brackus trick the children into gaining the four icons the defenders have hidden beneath Lake Maki. Brackus succeeds and gives the icons to K'Tahsh but is soon ambushed by Malco who has Brackus brutally injured for trying to take the icons and takes them himself, while just leaving K'Tahsh with a warning. Brackus dies moments later, with the defenders holding the final icon.

Her final task was leading her army of sigal slayers and S'ii to the defenders Dojo to obliterate them once and for all. However using the power of the two ancient sigils Erik causes an earthquake causing K'Tahsh to fall below to her death taking the crystal that controls the sigal slayers with her.

Her Guardian is a giant cybernetic bull, Taurius. She mostly uses it as a mount.

Lady K'Tahsh is voiced by Shauna MacDonald.

Secondary characters

Allies to the Defenders

Aaron the Strong
Aaron was Seth's father and leader of the previous Di-Gata Defenders. He sacrificed himself to help the Wizards of Yan to cast the Spell of Binding on the Megalith. So far, he is the only known Defender of the previous five. His most precious possession was the Nova stone, the Di-Gata Defender's ultimate weapon.

The Nova Stone and his guardian's stone suggests he specialized in Ogama, Nega, and Altas sigils, but this has not been confirmed or canon.  His guardian was Omniaxor, who is now merged with Kragus to form Omnikrag, another object of his legacy was passed on to Seth.

Azura
Azura is a small girl who is in training to be a Di-Gata Defender. They first met her and her brother Roodu at the mine where they first discovered the space ship, and where the kids were forced to find it in The Lost Children. After, they followed the Defenders back to the dojo and convinced them to be trained as Di-Gata Defenders. Brakus decided that she and her brother would be suitable for a new army of defenders, and let them stay at the dojo.

In Complications, Azura and Roodu stole Brackus' guardian stone (because they were bored of not practising with stones), and Seth though that they stole the Ethos container. They hid themselves, and tried to cast Darkviper, resulting in more chaos in the dojo. Seth got angry and banished Azura, her brother and the rest of the kids who came to become Defenders. On their way home, Brakus asked the kids if they would like to be secret defenders, and declared Azura and Roodu as leaders.

Azura is voiced by Jamie Bloch.

Bo
A brash young stone slinger who traveled with Erik and Mel to a cult fight to obtain eternal glory. He was willing to do anything to become known, even if he had to fight to the death. The Defenders taught him the true meaning of being a warrior, which was to do what was right for RaDos. In "Dark Descent", Bo had followed clues to the Yin Pure Stone (He then calls it the Hero Stone), but somehow got transported with the stone to the Binding Zone where he fought Malco and Flinch. He managed to help the Defenders by attaching an override device to their vehicle, causing it to spin out of control and send it and Malco flying. Flinch was dropped in  front of Seth. He then demanded to have his stone back but Seth aggressively told him that "Being a hero isn't about fighting bad guys or collecting Pure stones, it's about doing what is right." At the end of the episode, Bo still learned nothing and sets off to reclaim the Yin Stone.

After the Yin Pure Stone was destroyed, he tried his best to make himself a Di-Gata Defender. He ends up buying a mutant guardian from a dealer (which he names Bodicon, hinting on his own name). But Bodicon couldn't be controlled or returned to the stone from which it came. Rion managed to calm it down, allowing it to revert to its stone form. Seth refused to give Bodicon back to him until he learned to control it. He later interrupts the Defenders when they were dealing with their own guardians merged into a mutant. Bo tried to hitch a ride with Erik, but was ejected from the backseat before they chased it to Brackus' hut.

Later, he joins the Ogaman federation and arrests Erik for destroying the Tome of Al-Mortigar. The other Defenders, upon learning that the third icon is inside the prison, they ask for his help in getting them in. He refuses, but hears a distress call from the prison. He goes with the Defenders to help stop the riot, and is last seen declaring that he'd succeeded single-handedly. It has been stated by Greg Collinson that this will be his last appearance.

He is an ally to the Defenders to some degree, having helped them twice in the past; however, his attitude causes Seth and the others to consider him something of a reject.

He specializes in Dako and Ogama sigils. He has poor skill with his stones and is prone to miscasting.

Brim
The carver of the Pure Stones. Brim had been hiding in a mountain from Infinis Gislies for twelve years. He built robotic birds called the Kihn to keep himself company. His peace was shattered when the Defenders took shelter in his home. He absolutely didn't want to help them because of the way his inventions were used for evil. But they reminded him of what he held for human life and at Seth's request, he carved the Vitus stone. When Brackus sieged his home, Brim set his equipment on overload so he and the Defenders could escape. Outside, he took off on his jetpack, with the Nova stone from Seth that he used to create the Vitus stone.

Afterwards, he began to tinker with the Nova Stone's power. He managed to create a Prison function within the stone, allowing it to contain the spirit of the target. This was the key to defeating Nazmul, which gave Brackus his "trump card".

After the Nova Stone was "mysteriously" taken from him by Adam, Brim hid out in a cave outside Callisto. After Brakus found him and forced him to reveal where the Nova Stone was, he was banished to the Dark Realm by Madame Leizel.

He is later released and imprisoned within a cave, being watched by a guard. The Defenders get to him first and free him, but he gets kidnapped by Malco and Flinch, and taken to the mountains where a crystal lies; that can cut open the Nova Stone. He later opens the Nova Stone, releasing Nazmul. But because of the Prison function he added, he needed another host body to walk RaDos once more. Flinch decides to offer Brim up as the sacrifice, but Brim accidentally lost his balance and fell off the cliff, presumably to his death.

He ends up surviving the fall, but he becomes frozen solid on Mount Froza, being guarded by two Sigil Slayer creatures with their egg pile. When the Defenders discover that Brim was the one who wrote the Tome of Al-Mortigar, they contacted Brackus because he was the last one to see him alive. He tells them where they are and the Defenders go to the mountain. Adam, Erik and Rion retrieve Brim and defeat the Sigil Slayer parents. After the Defenders get away with him and the two icons, they ask him about the Tome of Al-Mortigar. They tell him it was trashed by accident, but he explains to them that there is "another way". Mel casts a spell to copy his memories of the tome to Erik, giving him the knowledge the book possesses. When they go to the Chi'Brek monument to make the exchange for Kara's life, they give them Brim instead of the book.

Brim is voiced by James Rankin.

Finn
A girl who was kidnapped on her way to her grandfather's farm by a traveling circus. Then later mind-controlled by a guardian known as "The Eye", which erased of all memory of her previous life. To keep the image of the circus, Finn became the contortionist of the troupe. The Defenders found out about the circus and broke the Eye's control over her and the troupe. She later appears in "Warriors" where Finn was again captured by a warrior cult. This cult pits people to fight to the death in order to become a true warrior. She teams with Bo for most of the episode, but later she helps out Melosa and Erik in the final match by fighting off the cult goons. She ends up escaping with the Defenders.

Finn specializes in the Sum and Dako sigils. Her guardian is Revoldenn, a floating jester like creature with a sinister laugh.

Finn is voiced by Stacey DePass.

Jeo
A girl who lives with her grandmother underground. She has never seen the surface world before and dreams of one day seeing it. She stumbles across Seth after he threatened to attack her pet (he didn't know). She then gets saved by Seth with the help of OmniKragg after she tried to protect her pet from one of the Sandworms. She later takes him to her home, only to find that her grandmother had captured the rest of the Defenders. She persuaded her not to harm them. Jeo shows Seth the secret of their existence underground - a piece of the Celestial Abyss called the Source. With this source, their tribe was able to live underground in prosperity until all that was left was Jeo and her grandmother. Seth didn't want to harm their society, but they needed the Celestial Abyss, so he engages in a conversation with her about her dream: The surface world. He confesses to her about the trick when they are pinned by Kor Yin-an's attack spell. After he escapes with the Source, Mel uses her Wizard Powers to rise the settlement to the surface. She forgives Seth for tricking her, as her dream of going to the surface world came true.

Joshu
A boy who lives in the mining village attacked by Kid Cole in "The Magnificent Two". He idolizes the Defenders, and spends his time practicing to be like them. He also tries to perform some of the Defenders' casts, like Seth' 'Spinning Doom'.

When Kid Cole kidnaps him, Joshu leaves a trail of Di-Gata stones for Erik and Rion to follow. They rescue him and defeat Kid Cole when Brackus retakes control over Darkviper, who pushes him from his treehouse base, presumably to his death.

Erik returns in the village in "Mel on my Mind" and is greeted by an enthusiastic Joshu, who is more than happy to give him the dakocite he needs for his stone carving. When Mel calls Erik, asking him how to reverse the love-effect of Azura's pet, he sends Joshu to the dojo with the cure. Joshu arrives during the battle between Seth and K'Tash, and the latter knocks the vial out of his hand, releasing the Dakocite dust and curing Mel, Rion, and Brackus.

Lydia
Sister to the Zion of Rados, Lydia betrayed her people by stealing the Heart Stone, which belonged to the Amphinigons. She intended to use it just for the Radosians, believing them to be the only beings on Rados worthy of the stone's energy, claiming the Amphinigons didn't deserve it because she thought they were ugly. Her vehicle crashed during her escape, so she called on the Defenders for help. Mel, Erik, and Adam arrived to keep the pursuing party of Amphinigons from harming her, but lost the Heart Stone to them. Lydia them told them that her brother had been abducted by the Amphinigons, and the stone was a family heirloom. They travel to the Amphinigons camp (although Mel is separated from them) to steal the Stone back and save Lydia's brother. They succeed with the stone, but then Lydia insists they leave without her brother. Upon Seth's arrival, the group is then captured by the Amphinigons. Lydia's brother arrives with the creatures' princess, who both explain that the Heart Stone was going to be shared between the two races. Lydia escapes the camp, but the Defenders and the Amphinigons outrun her. She threatens to destroy the Heart Stone but is fortunately stopped. The Heart Stone took minor damage, but was still usable.

Maia
A small girl from a village attacked by monsters. In 'What Lies Beneath', she was on her way to what she calls 'The Safe Place', presumably Arboth, and came across Seth and Omniaxor. She revealed herself after Seth deserted Omniaxor at the Dojo, and they decided that Seth would listen to her if she asked him to return to the Defenders, instead of Omniaxor.

Maia's violet Sum eyes do not see what people look like on the outside, but show her who they are at heart. She insists to everyone that nothing is wrong with them. Examples of this power included seeing Seth as a pure-hearted being (despite being merged with Kragus), while seeing Brackus as an evil, demonic entity.

When she appears again in Complications, her eyes and power change. Her eyes are now red, and the Sum sigil has formed a henge with Dako. She cannot see into people's hearts, but she now has the ability to see into the future (something she does not appreciate, as her visions are generally dark and sinister). She came to visit the Defenders with more children that want to become Defenders, but was later thrown out with them for suspicion of stealing an Ethos canister from the vault. Seth later realized, however, that she might have been framed, since the canister was stolen before her arrival at the Dojo.

Brackus manipulated Maia and Roodu into retrieving the four Icons from the sunken Prime Radosian starship. She later witnessed what she presumed to be Seth murdering Brackus, as she had seen in her vision, when in fact he was granting him mercy. Seth later told her the truth after she saved him from sigil slayers. In the series finale, in the aftermath of the Ethos' defeat, Maia became witness to bright orbs appearing in the sky.

Maia is voiced by Melanie Tonello.

Roodu
Roodu first appeared in The Lost Children, when he and his sister Azura were captured and used to find the space ship crash site. Afterwards, he and his sister Azura followed the defenders to their dojo, and broke in, pleading to Erik to become defenders, so they can protect Rados. Brakus decides that they would be good for a new army of defenders, and decides that they could stay, he being their trainer.

In Complications, Roodu and his sister steal Darkviper's guardian stone, as Seth thinks they stole the ethos container. After running away from Seth, they cast the stone, resulting in Darkviper going on a rampage. Seth became enraged and told the kids to go home, along with Maia and the other kids who came to be defenders. On their trip home, Brakus asks the kids if they would like to be part of a secret mission, leaving the kids by themselves, with Roodu and Azura in charge.

Si'i
A shady man with a Spanish accent and appearance, who could create mutant guardians from other guardians, and the developer of the Guardianizer; a device which allowed him to do this. He was, long ago, was ordered by Brackus to "create the ultimate Guardian" that could be used to defeat the Defenders, but never got around to giving him one.

When the Defenders came months later to shut down his operation, Si'i merged their Guardians into one mutant being that went after Brackus to destroy him. With Erik's technical expertise, and Si'i's knowledge of the Guardianizer, they were able to break apart their guardians and restore them to normal. Si'i was then locked in Gatashin prison, for illegal dealing of Guardians and endangering the lives of the Defenders.

After a while in the prison, he began to seek a more peaceful existence, free from crime and illegal trade; until Zads broke him out of prison. Malco then demanded to know how to create a guardian out of a person, using the same Guardianizer technology he created. Scarefully, he tells Dark Malco that he require three different Plasma Stones, ordered in certain fashion. After spilling the beans, Dark Malco orders the Zad to terminate him. The Defenders manage to save him and Si'i saves Erik from the Black Tar, gaining the trust of the Defenders.

He later helps Erik dismantle the new Guardianizer to reverse its effects against Rion, by rearranging the Plasma Stones (they needed to dismantle it because they wouldn't budge), which succeeds, but costs him his humanity. He ends up falling into a lava pit with the Guardianizer, which warped his physical being, turning him into a mutated Guardian himself. He then flies away.

He has become the interest of Lady K'tahsh, as she believes his morphed state would be of help to the Ethos cause. She has tracked him to a tribal village, and had kidnapped Melosa to flush him out and sacrifice her in a King Kong like fashion. However, he goes berserk in the village and drains the energy of the tribe's leader, and eventually kills Kali. K'tahsh manages to capture him and sent him on his first task, retrieve the Orb of Ogama-Yan.

But soon, Si'i grew very hard to control and once broke free from the Ethos' control until he was captured again. But he still grew rebellious, so the Ethos had to personally come out and subdue him.

At the end of the second season, Rion uses the ancient guardian language to communicate with Si'i, who attacks the last Ethos but is turned back to his human form.

Tzur
A giant two-faced rock golem, that lived in the temple that Rion was training in before he met the Defenders. It was the only family Rion had during his training. Its first face was on its stomach and appeared monstrous (spoke like a male). The second one was on the head and had a caring face (spoke like a female). It spoke to the Defenders about the Shift Stone's purpose, and where they need to go to open the portal to get Kara out. It also gave the guardian stone containing Arvengus to Rion, telling him to "use it when the time comes". While the Zad and Ethos creatures attacked the temple, Tzur creates a portal to allow the Defenders to escape to the Yin-Tos Ridge. But because of the portal's size, Tzur wasn't able to fit inside of it. Tzur sacrificed itself at the hands of the Zad and their Ethos stones so the others could escape. Before the Defenders escaped, Rion was traumatized by the loss and eventually revealed his dark incarnation power to kill one of the Zad and cause the others to retreat in fear.

Von Faustien
An Ethos hunter who uses advanced technology and methods to trap or destroy Ethos creatures. However, he often didn't take into consideration other lives around him. He would even go as far as taking down an Ethos if there was an innocent civilian taken hostage or within the area of effect of the weapon. When he was young, his entire family was killed by Ethos creatures, which gives him the motivation to protect RaDos from these creatures.

When the Defenders meet him, they decide to seek their help getting the first piece of the Celestial Abyss. And Eric seeks his help in regards to his invention - a weapon that can bide the power of an incoming attack and send it back at the attacker. He ends up giving him the stone that can help him do so.

After he abandons the Defenders to hunt down Lady K'tahsh. And he was willing to destroy 10 miles of Port Reevus with an Annihilator Stone, just to destroy her. It was also revealed that he had an Ethos parasite living inside his body, the source of his radical behavior. K'tahsh uses her powers to awaken the creature inside and he becomes possessed by its presence. Before him and K'tahsh escape with the piece of the Celesial Abyss, Erik used Von's Ethos Trapper weapon against him and extracted the Ethos from his body, freeing him from possession. Erik then uses his upgraded weapon to release the energy from the Annihilator Stone into the sky, saving Reevus from being destroyed.

Von Faustein is voiced by Andrew Jackson.

Enemies to the Defenders

Doku
An ex-advisor to Nazmul and the Order of Infinis. His position was usurped by Brackus using force. Causing him to lose his right arm and a portion of his right eye, which are now mechanical (almost giving him the appearance of a cyborg). His robotic arm carries the power to create portals to anywhere in RaDos, much like Brackus or Flinch can do. Both his fake eye and arm can fire energy lasers to attack enemies besides his Di-Gata stones.

Unlike Brackus, he follows and trusts Nazmul completely, without any plans of taking over the Order. He was also aware of Brackus' treachery and wanted to regain his position before Brackus had his way (as Nazmul demanded loyalty from his subordinates).

In the episode "Doom Chase", he forced Seth to go to Brackus' Keep and kill him. He offered him this chance so he could regain his spot at Nazmul's side. But Seth saw this as a shot at retrieving the Key back from the Order. However, Seth only had 6 hours to do it before Kara was killed by the Saviped's slow acting poison (in which Doku owned the Saviped and poisoned her with it). If he had done it in time, he would have administered the antidote, which was later a trick to let Kara die, use Seth to regain his own position in the Order, and eliminated an enemy to Nazmul. However, it was all in vain as Seth escaped from Brackus's Keep and got Kara to the forest where the Viridian Spiders lived, as the milk of these creatures was the antidote to the Saviped poison.

After the Defenders find their new dojo ("The Healer"), they discover a recording device that picked up his voice. The Defenders tracked him to a cave where a fight between him and his warlords. Rion attracts his attention and a fight breaks out between the Defenders and his followers. After Rion's Argent Warrior wears off, Doku fires Venomous Barb at him, but Seth takes the shot and becomes poisoned. After Seth gets cured, the Defenders are led to a dead-end (Seth's lack of direction) where they must have a re-match with Doku and his followers. Brackus intervenes in the combat just as the Defenders were about to be dropped into the lava-pit. Doku thought it was pitiful what happened to Brackus, for he wasn't his treacherous, normal self that defeated Doku. Brackus managed to distract Doku long enough for Erik to break free of the vine encasement, and Erik uses Destructor to create a rocket, trapping Doku and his followers and sending them to another location. Upon landing, Doku swore to get back at Brackus.

In "The Tower", Doku, Adam and his associates reactivate an ancient tower built by the Wizards of Yan, planning to harvest the energy of Arboth to rejuvenate his lost hand and eye. He managed to restore his lost body parts, but had to face Brackus when he boarded, and manages to defeat him with ease. He offers Seth (who was corrupted by the Infinimatter leakage in his first arm) the chance to restore his lost arm. At first he accepts it, but he returns the stone power to Arboth after he saw what he had done to do so. Brackus then casts Devastation of Infinis after getting back up and it knocks Doku out of the tower, sending him falling to the ground below. In "Nightfall", Doku is revealed to have survived, hiding amongst a cult desiring to reactivate another Wizard tower. When the Defenders incidentally provided the power source for the tower, it went through a wormhole to Rados Prime, where all Radosians originated from. Doku then took control of the tower and eliminated the cult and attempted to take the final Icon, but was defeated and left to die on Rados Prime.

Doku specializes in the Dako and Ogama sigils and his spells involve using the Black Arts, a form of evil sorcery. His guardian is Tormentor.

Doku is voiced by Kedar Brown.

General Hodd
The general dictator of Ogama-gor in "Escape from Ogama-Gor". He was placed in charge of collecting energy for a Dako-generator weapon, which was to help Brackus in his conquest. This weapon was kept under secrecy, and making the Containment Stones which stored its power often gave away what was happening. When he failed to prevent the Defenders' escape, he was "punished" by being sealed into a containment stone. His Guardian was Lockdown, a containment robot that used mines and laser cannons to attack opponents.

General Hodd is voiced by Ron Pardo

General Rube
Brackus' second-in command of the Yin-tos army. First appeared in "The Cycle" as part of Flinch's excavation team. He abandoned Flinch because of Infinimora. In "What Lies Beneath", Brackus promoted him to the rank of general before assaulting Arboth. Rube later assisted the Defenders into breaking to the Infinis keep. He needed their help because he and his comrades were branded as traitors. And as traitors, they would have been hunted down like dogs if Nazmul was able to make a move. He kept this short lived alliance a secret from Brackus. When Nazmul began to take out soldiers and tanks of the Yin-tos army, Rube reaffirmed his allegiance to him so he could be spared. His current status is unknown as he may have been killed during the Spell of Binding.

Infinimora
King Magnun, the last of the Bakorian kings, who knew the secret to immortality, had fused with his guardian Volcanis, becoming Infinimora. He kidnapped Kara, so she could be used as his new body, because of her ability to channel sigil energy. However, the Defenders, with the help of Flinch, sealed the king's spirit in Voltanis' guardian stone while destroying Voltanis. Flinch escaped with the stone to give to Nazmul. After learning all he could from Magnun, Nazmul destroyed the stone. It is assumed that Magnun's spirit was destroyed as a result.

Infinimora has the appearance of a two-headed mummy. He is capable of firing bandages at other and hold wizard like power that enable Infinimora to create Di-Gata stones. The king's spirit can also leave the Inifimora host to possess a physical vessel (e.g. Kara). Magnun's wizard powers specialize in Yin, Yan, Sum and Altas sigils.

Kali
A reptilian shapeshifting agent of Nazmul who was assigned to find her master a new body. Kali saw Kara as a suitable host for Nazmul because of her great potential. She posed as a fallen Defender, Rayald, who was traveling with them to the Nexus. Putting a band on Kara's arm, it allowed Kali to enter the Nexus without being rejected. Then she changed into Dod the "Nexus Keeper". In this form, she tricked Seth, Melosa and Erik into thinking that the sigil energies that sustained the Nexus were out of order. However, Namoor, the true keeper of the Nexus, discovered the plot and smashed the armband, banishing Kali from the Nexus. She later worked for her people, the Mortigarians, who wanted the Tome of Al-Mortigar and the Celestial Abyss. She posed as Kara to infiltrate the Defenders but Seth sees through her disguise when he noticed in an ultimate mirror that she had no reflection. She managed to escape with the Orb of Ogama-Yan and the key to the Tome but was mortally wounded by Si'i. Seth tried to save her but there was nothing he could do. As an act of kindness, she tells him where Kara was before perishing.

Kali apparently used a guardian named Vanathos.

Kali is voiced by Tricia Brioux.

Kid Cole
Kid Cole is a bandit who tried to frame the Defenders for his crimes in "The Town that Time Forgot", as he was raiding caravans for their supplies and selling them to the villages for a price. Adam was in his gang but betrayed him to save Mel and the other Defenders. Kid Cole then challenged Seth to a duel, having a six-on-one advantage by having Cole's gang back attack him and locking the Defenders in the Dojo. Adam was able to free himself and the others with the Phase Stone, and Kid Cole was eventually defeated when Seth made him quietly confess everything in private, while wearing an audio recording stone around his neck. The confession was then broadcast loud and clear by Erik's gauntlet to the villagers. Afterwards, Seth called Kragus (who fell out of his pocket) and grabbed Cole, he was then arrested and sent to the Gatashin Prison, being escorted by Adam.

He returned in "The Magnificent Two", taking control of a mining town and forcing the people to mine enough Dakocite to make him indestructible armour. He attacks Erik, who, along with Rion, tries to save the villagers. Cole ends up seriously injuring Erik with his new guardian, then kidnaps and holds hostage a small boy. Rion and Erik track him with a trail of stones the boy leaves behind. Rion and Erik defeat Cole, with Brackus' help. Brackus managed to retake control of Darkviper, and forced it to turn on Cole, causing his armor to break and him to fall. Afterwards, Brackus starts using his new guardian in his battles.

He specialized in Dako, Nega and Yin sigils and his spells involved manipulation of sand and heat. His guardian was Stinger, a giant scorpion. He later uses Darkviper, a larger more twisted version of Anaconduit. Then loses Darkviper to Brackus.

Kid Cole is voiced by Peter Oldring.

Kor Yin-an
He was a Yan-Nega class wizard who fought in the battle between the Ethos and the Wizards in the Battle of Yan-Suma. In an attempt to save himself, Kor Yin-an tried to strike a deal with the Ethos: He would give them the Wizards and their Allies, plus information about the tunnel network underneath the temple to do so; in return for a place in the Ethos' rule. On the sidelines, he tried to have his allies make peace with the Ethos, knowing they wouldn't comply. However, the Ethos were banished shortly after the Celestial Abyss was triggered, and Mel told them the Ethos had planned a trap inside the Temple, causing Nazmul to order a portion of Yin-tos soldiers and Alnar to protect the inner temple.

His traitorous scheme was not discovered until several moons later. As punishment, the wizards put Kor in a state of permanent undeath, the Arkham Mal Rash turning him into a lich, and to be chained as penance. No Radosian or Ethos know where Kor was sealed. But they feared if his tomb was found, RaDos would have to face his eternal wrath. He was awakened by Malco to track the remaining Icons of the Celestial Abyss in exchange of release from his current state. Underground, he confronts the Defenders, revealing to Mel that it was he who gave her the staff at Yan-Suma as a projection. It was his intention that she would find the Eternity Stone and change history, to allow the Ethos to win. But she caught on and ended up restoring the timeline. To get his revenge, he planned to suck her lifeforce. He faced Mel off in a duel to the death. Just as she held him at spear-point, he uses his plea from fifteen years ago to "make peace with the Ethos". He steals the second Icon and escapes, promising that he will have his revenge another day.

Eventually, Kor's obsession for revenge began to conflict with his agreement with the Ethos, so Malco decided he outlived his usefulness. He had Kor's body destroyed by Lady K'Tahsh and his chains shattered, but in doing so he unwittingly sets Kor free from the chains. Kor, being undead, survives the assassination attempt, and upon reviving he attacks Malco and Lady K'Tahsh and steals the Sacred Icons.

After stealing the fourth Icon, Kor demanded that Melosa meet him in the court where he was judged, where he would judge her for the mistakes the Wizards made. In the process, he accidentally revealed that his attempts for peace were actually to save himself, so he had to kill her. However, he was defeated and ended of his misery.

Kor Yin-an is voiced by Kedar Brown.

Madam Leizel
The leader of a circus band and its fortune teller. It is presumed that Leizel can indeed predict the future, despite the fact she goes crazy. However, her predictions are always in unclear riddles.

When the Defenders helped out the traveling troupe, Leizel told Melosa her future. "Eight was once nine, and soon will be again." (She was most likely talking about the sigils) "A talent both rare and powerful stirs within you." (Mel's Wizard powers.) However, she was having trouble with her guardian, the Eye, who was controlling everyone wearing stone necklaces. With the help of Mel, they defeated the Eye and returned it to its stone form.

In a Rougon base, Leizel told Kara that Nazmul is coming for her, and talked about something involving the pure stones, and a cycle. She may have been referring to the Megalith's Cycle. She then appears in the Infinis Keep, informing Brackus how to obtain the Pure Stones.

She reveals to Brackus how he could destroy Nazmul once for all using the Nova Stone as a prison to contain his spirit, and telling him that 'The Lost One' had it. (Adam). But her reward for giving him the information inevitably lead her to her banishment to the Dark Realm, where she is now a wraith amongst the dark spirits that inhabit the realm. Even in her current state, she crazily told Kara to go to the Tower of Nowa to escape the Dark Realm. Some speculation indicates that she is a servant of the Ethos.

Madame Leizel is voiced by Ellen-Ray Hennessy.

Sari
A stone carver who lived in Callisto with the third Pure Stone. She originally carved the Nova Stone with Nazmul and still held loyalty to him. She tells them where the Yin Pure Stone is and how to defeat the creature that guards it. However, she was willing to take Kara back to Nazmul, still believing he could reshape the Realm of RaDos and not destroy it (The Defenders believed Nazmul has gone insane with power and was willing to go as far as destroying RaDos). She later falls to her doom at the hands of Kara's new powers.

Sari is voiced by Tricia Brioux.

Snare
A vicious bounty hunter with a cold attitude towards the Defenders, Snare is a powerful enemy to defeat. He wears a metal mask every time, and when removed, it reveals his darkest secret. Snare is a lizard-like creature with quick agility and speed. He wears many gadgets that help him at times, and has deep yellow eyes that are easy to recognize. He also has Di-Gata stones himself when needed. He was first sent by Brackus in "Snared" to capture the Defenders. He managed to catch Mel, Erik, and Kara, but Adam (who obviously had previous experience with Snare) and Seth were able to hold him off. Mel eventually was able  to summon Draykor, who temporarily freezes Snare. Snare fled the battle, promising Brackus he'd be better prepared next time. He then found the Defenders and followed them from Port Reevus and was captured by the Ogama-Gor drones in "Escape from Ogama-Gor", later joined by Seth. The two were forced to make a temporary truce to escape. Seth was able to free not only himself, but every other prisoner, and Snare began tracking the Defenders again. The last act he did for the Order was to try to steal back the Key from the Defenders, which eventually got counter-stolen by Adam. According to the creator of the show, Greg Collinson, there was only one survivor to the fight for the Key, and who did we see in the second season?

Snare specializes in Sum and Yin sigils. His Guardian is Sliver.

The Mortagarians
The Mortagarians look just like Kali, except a bit different. They claim they are the true inhabitants of Rados until humans came from their dying homeworld and took over. The women Mortagarians are shape-shifters. They captured Kara and sent Kali in her place to find the Tome of Al-mortigar. They blamed the defenders because they think that they killed her, so to get Kara back, the defenders had to get the tome for them to get Kara back. In Di-Gata Dawn they join forces with the defenders during the Ethos war after Erik admits that humanity did invade their planet, and shows them the two lost signals as peace offerings.

They live underwater, and despite being amphibious they don't like it when they are out of water.

The Professor
Never addressed by name but was seen only in The Lost Children, The Professor was a mad scientist who searching for proof that humanity had come to Rados from another planet. He discovered down in a mine a virus that was invariably lethal to adult species, yet harmless against children. After learning that children were immune to the virus, he started abducting them using his inventions to lure children to the mine then trap them. This caused the surrounding towns believe that the area was haunted, prompting the Di-Gata Defenders to investigate. Rion was soon abducted after looking for the children and was forced by The Professor to help find the proof he needed. Eventually he found an ancient space craft, proving his theory (and the Mortigarians' story) that humanity was indeed from another planet, and not native to Rados. Rion and Seth soon followed and the Professor discovered the ship's power cell, which activated a transmission from the original captain. The transmission explained that the ship had been forced to make an emergency landing on Rados after an outbreak of the aforementioned virus and a confrontation with the Rath Marak, and warned not to disturb the ship to avoid risking an outbreak of the virus. Though Seth and Rion were skeptical about the appearance of the ship captain (having far darker skin than was usual of humanity), the Professor surmised that humanity evolved into its current form due to prolonged exposure to sunlight. Obsessed with his discovery, the Professor attempts to move the ancient ship to an unspecified university, despite the risk of causing the virus to get loose. Rion ends up inadvertently killing The Professor by damaging his bio suit, causing him to be contaminated by the virus, to which he perishes.

The Professor is voiced by Sean Cullen.

The Zads
A mysterious race of humanoid anteaters. When the Defenders were trying to defeat the Order of Infinis, a specific Zad was acting as a helper to the Defenders. This Zad was first appeared at the monastery of Amos-Yan and lead them to an elevator shaft. He did this after he searched through and devoured a portion of the Defender's supplies. He later appears in the location of the Dako Pure Stone, helping fight off Malco and Flinch. He even gives Kara a sigil spirit to see what is happening to Melosa (this spirit is also seen in Nexus - it helps her find out about and shows her where the Nexus is). Zad also leads Kara to Madam Lisel in "The Den of Thieves", to a warning that was meant for Melosa. His last helpful appearance lead the Defenders and Adam to the Infinis Army, allowing them to get access to Nazmul's Keep.

However, after "Ethos", the Ethos emissaries gave a Zad a Shift Stone, a special hexagon shaped timer that determines when the portal between RaDos and the Dark Realm would be opened. He revealed his true colors when he captured Kara and sent her to the Dark Realm. The Defenders failed to save her and the Zad that completed his mission perished within the confines of his own spell.

Most Zad warriors are armed with whips that contain paralysis effects, have high agility and are the only beings that use Ethos with other sigils (most commonly with Dako). Their only known spell fires a device similar to the Power of the Guild, except explodes into a highly viscous liquid, that pulls targets under it like quicksand. They also tame dark serpents to fight with them in the front lines of battle.

In "Back Track", when Mel messed up the timeline by freezing the Celestial Abyss, the Zad became pig-like, bigger and more dangerous. One practically incapacitated the Defenders and Brackus in mere seconds. Yet, it was defeated by Rion in his mutant form. When the timeline was restored, the Zad trying to get at the Defenders reverted to normal and fell into the bottomless well from whence they came.

Known guardians
Guardians were creatures that lived in RaDos before the death of the Primorials, but now exist within green Di-Gata stones called Guardian Stones. They are made of pure energy, and they vary in size, appearance, and abilities. Some casters consider Guardians as friends, and others as servants. Most are bound to a Sigil (e.g. Kragus is summoned from a Dako stone), but some are bound to henges (e.g. Omnikrag has the henge of Dako and Altas). Most of these sigils or henges are engraved on a part of the guardian's body, with an exception to Anaconduit (different henge) and Voltanis. Some casters like to say a short phrase when summoning their guardians (most notably the defenders). Whether this is required or not remains to be seen. Commonly, when a Guardian is defeated or has been out for too long, it returns to its stone. Guardians are only killed when their stones do not return to the caster, or if it shatters. Even humans can become guardians if changed.

Arvengus
This guardian belongs to Rion. Tzur gives him the stone for Arvengus before he falls at the hands of the Zad. Arvengus is a giant lion with sharp claws, fangs and multiple rock tipped tails. For an attack, he could either use his claws and fangs, or send electricity through his tails and whip them at enemies. Like the other defenders guardians (other than Draykor) Arvengus has a mini-form which looks like a lion kitten. Arvengus is bound to the henge of Nega and Yan (Yan exists between the bar and the lightning bolt bottom). This henge is engraved on his stomach.

Anaconduit
Brackus' guardian. Has the appearance of a Cobra. Anaconduit is capable of firing electrical attacks from his mouth and stinging with his tail. When redirected back at Anaconduit, he can harm himself with his own powers. Anaconduit was torn in half by Nazmul in "The Perfect Host", revealing that Anaconduit had some mechanical parts underneath. When Brackus was banished to the Dark Realm, Anaconduit had joined him. However, it later got taken by Si'i and rebuilt as Darkviper (see below). Anaconduit's stone is bound to a henge of Infinis and Nega (The top line of Nega is replaced with Infinis. Strangely, this guardian's mark is not engraved anywhere on his body but it has the Megalith's henge engraved on its forehead in its place).

Bodicon
Bo's guardian. Have the appearance of a two-headed hydra. Bo purchased it from Si'i in hopes of being accepted as a Defender. However, Bodicon went wild at the dojo at the sound of Robutus' cleaning equipment. Rion managed to calm him down and Bodicon returned to his stone. Seth kept the stone until Bo learned to be more responsible.

Darkviper
Darkviper is a by-product of a merge between Anaconduit and another guardian. Created by Si'i and was used by Kid Cole. Brackus was able to convince Darkviper to turn on Cole when the latter orders him harshly. Darkviper then threw his second master off from his base. Rion gave Darkviper's stone to Brackus, who began to use it, but never in sight of the other Defenders. It is a giant version of Anaconduit, except biological and has a darker appearance. It uses its massive body to constrict and damage opponents. Darkviper's stone is bound to a henge of Yin, Infinis and Nega (The top line of Nega is replaced with Infinis, which the Yin sits on top of. This guardian's mark is not engraved anywhere on his body).

Doomhunter
The Doomhunter is a massive and powerful guardian that protects the Yin pure stone in Castillo. It resembles a giant crustacean creature. Sari stated to the Defenders that only the massive power contained in the Nova Stone could defeat the Doomhunter, which they didn't have at the time. To compensate, they then tried to channel the Warrior Henge through Kara, however Seth couldn't take her suffering so he let go. The incomplete cast resulted in an energy blast that knocked the Doomhunter into a pillar but failed to destroy it. While they ran from the creature, Adam appeared and handed over the Nova stone to Seth, which was then used to finally defeat it.

Other than sheer size and strength, the Doomhunter can fire energy blasts from the pure stone on his tail.

The Doomhunter is not necessarily a guardian found in a stone, but it has the Yan sigil engraved on its forehead.

Draykor
Draykor is Melosa's guardian. She appears as a small ice dragon. Unlike other guardians, Draykor lives within Melosa's amulet, which was passed down from her previous generations. She is the smallest of the Defenders' guardians. Draykor can also be a little bit overprotective of Melosa. Draykor has two common attacks: She can freeze her target with her tail using Chill Bane, and she can come out as an ice spirit and freeze anything she flies into by using Freezing Avatar of Yan. She is the only one of the defenders guardians who does not have a small form. Draykor is bound to the Yan sigil, which is engraved on her stomach.

Dreadcrow
Flinch's guardian. Has the appearance of a scarecrow. Dreadcrow is capable of firing crows from his sleeves and can separate into two crows. Dreadcrow's stone is bound to a henge of Infinis and Yin (The line in the middle is replaced with Infinis, and is engraved on his chest). The odd thing about his stone is that the henge doesn't appear (The Infinis is above the Yan), unless it's summoned.

The Eye
Madam Lisel's guardian. It has two forms: a crystal ball and a giant Y-shaped creature. In its giant form, the Eye can shoot laser beams powerful enough to break through Kragus. In ball form, the Eye can tell an unspecific future. However, in order to see the future, the Eye needs a fresh supply of memories. When the eye returns to its stone form, Lisel is certain the Eye won't trouble her but will never be free of it. The Eye's stone is bound to the Altas sigil (engraved on its Iris).

Firefox
Firefox is Adam's Guardian. It appears as a two-legged red fox. As its name implies, it is a fox that has the power of fire. Its more basic attack allows it to send out a fire beam from its tail. But with increased power from Adam's Booster Stones, it has the power to turn into a flame snake. Firefox's stone is bound to the Infinis sigil (engraved on its legs).

Kragus
Kragus was Seth's guardian, resembling a rock giant. At first, Seth wanted a dragon, but when Kragus took a few of his things (e.g.: his arsenal), he began to like him. He is sometimes called "Big Guy", even in his small form. Kragus requires a portion of rocks and the itself to construct a body. The stronger the materials are, the more hardened Kragus becomes. For instance, there is a difference between forming on sigil hardened rock (which he cannot form) than there is with Dakocite (one of the strongest rock types in RaDos). He attacks with his body or sends out his arms using Rock Slam.

Kragus was destroyed by Omniaxor but transferred himself into Seth's body, giving Seth enormous strength and power. However, the merge also gave Seth Kragus' aggressive personality. Kragus was presumed dead until the merge was discovered in "The Cycle". Before the discovery, Seth was having strange and sudden bursts of strength when angry, and was able to absorb large amounts of energy from weapons before getting exhausted, when some weapons would incapacitate a person in one or a few shots. It wasn't until Volcanis spat acid on Seth's chest that the Defenders realized what was going on.

The merge takes a drastic toll on Seth's body in "What Lies Beneath" and beyond. Now, the top half of his body, his neck and his right arm have turned into rock, and a stone mask forms over his face when in battle. Although he was offered a piece of Di-Gata Ore from Melosa in Arboth (which would purge or separate Seth from Kragus at the cost of Kragus' death), he decided not to because he didn't want to lose him again. In "Ethos", a Megalith-possessed woman separated Kragus from Seth with an attack, leaving Kragus badly weakened and unable to return to a stone. Kragus merged with Omniaxor, forming Omnikragg to save his spirit.

Like Robotus, Kragus can sometimes come out as a tiny, cartoonish form of himself. He is more playful than he is aggressive. This form is often used as a distraction against guards (Guard looks down at Kragus who waves at him. While the guard is distracted, an attack is fired to incapacitate the guard), or just when Seth doesn't want to call him out in his full size.

Kragus's stone was bound to the Dako sigil (engraved on various parts of his body) before the stone was destroyed. But as Omnikrag, the combined stone is engraved with the henge of Altas and Dako.

Lockdown
Hodd's guardian. He has the appearance of a four-legged robot. He keeps repeating: "Do not be alarmed. You will not be hurt." He can fire mini-explosives marked with the Infinis sigil at his target.

Lockdown's stone is bound to the henge of Ogama and Infinis (Infinis appeared under the Ogama's arc), although the sigils are engraved separately all over his body.

Megalith
Formed from much of RaDos's sigil power, the Megalith was the most powerful guardian ever created. It served as Nazmul's guardian, and its job was to make havoc for its master. It had the appearance of a giant, multi-eyed dust mite.

It was sealed with the Four Pure Stones twelve years before the story's timeline. But because of the damage it caused to RaDos each time the Spell of Binding was cast, it shattered a large portion of the realm and sacrificed the Defender's parents. As the years went by, it slowly began to break through the seal. The Defenders managed to get their hands on all four Pure Stones, but they stopped the Spell of Binding by destroying the machine for it. They were warned previous times by Sari and Brim about just how devastating the spell was. And they didn't realize it until the Spell Zone was being torn apart and Nazmul explained it to Seth during their battle. Although it would cause the Megalith to be sealed forever, it would have completely destroyed RaDos. The Megalith breaks free of its prison, planning to regenerate itself from the sigil energy of Arboth. During its rampage, it possessed an old woman to distract the Defenders. In the process of battling her, it separated Kragus from Seth. When they reach Arboth, the Defenders along with Adam try to keep the beast under control with everything they had. But not even Omnikragg, freezing, or incapacitating it wouldn't work. Utilizing the power of the Warrior Henge (between Seth, Mel, Kara and Adam (Eric was knocked out)), the Nova Stone, and Kara's power of energy absorption, the Defenders defeated the beast, giving the sigil energy back to Rados.

Though it was at first believed that Nazmul created the Megalith, events from the episode "The Cycle" seem to indicate otherwise. Apparently, the Megalith was sealed for hundreds of years but the cycles keep getting shorter. It was the intention of the Wizards of Yan that after several bindings, the Megalith would be forever imprisoned. The true origins of the Megalith were revealed in "Ethos" when Alnar told the Defenders the dark creatures known as Ethos were banished and as a result, created the creature. And that his sealing was required to imprison the Ethos and the Megalith together.

Although the Megalith may have been created by the Realm's energy, his stone was bound to a henge of Altas and Infinis (The horizontal ends of Altas are replaced with Infinis' halves), engraved in both his middle top eye, forehead, and his tail.

Nostrum Vitae
The Nostrum Vitae sigil stone creates a guardian body for itself, mostly in the shape of the first Primordial guardian, whose name is also Nostrum Vitae. This guardian appears in another season, when Brackus loses Darkviper. This effect is similar to Bionicle's Kanohi Iginika, the Legendary Mask of Life.

Omniaxor
Omniaxor, also called "Omni," was Aaron's guardian. He appears as a three-legged, pot-bellied giant. He is the only known Guardian who has the ability of speech.

After the Spell of Binding was cast, the Gatashin Monks placed him as protector of the Pinnacle, which infuriated him. For a long time, he became convinced that the Wizards of Yan sacrificed the Defenders. When the Defenders came to bring Melosa's wizard powers under control, he engaged Seth in battle. In the process, he destroyed Kragus for getting in the way of an attack that was meant for Seth. However, Melosa emerged under complete control of her powers, sending Omniaxor back into his stone.

In "Dark Descent", Seth summoned Omniaxor to ask him what happened in the location of the Spell of Binding but Omniaxor returned to his stone, unable to bear the sight of the Spell Zone. Later, in "What Lies Beneath", he reveals to Seth that he didn't mean to destroy Kragus and cause Seth to become what he is. While revealing this, Omniaxor shows he is very regretful of his actions against Seth and for destroying Kragus. He later pledges himself as "The Guardian of Seth, Son of Aaron". When Kragus was separated from Seth, seeing as they both serve the same master, the two guardians merged, creating Omnikragg.

Omniaxor is capable of tremendous strength and can hurl energy blasts. His stone is bound to the Altas sigil, which is engraved on his belly.

Omnikragg
The by-product of a merge between Omniaxor and the separated Kragus formed Seth's new guardian. Like Kragus, he requires a portion of the ground itself to take a physical form. But he has the appearance Omniaxor except for a few features. His three legs, his upper half, helmet and arms are now made of rock. He also has red claws. His only known power is his immense physical strength and he can hurl energy blasts similar to Omniaxor. And like Omniaxor, he sometimes speaks in the human tongue as well as roaring like Kragus.

Omnikrag's stone is bound to a henge of Altas and Dako (The Dako's line cuts through the center of Altas, engraved on his helmet).

Revoldenn
Finn's guardian. He resembles a genie/jester and his stone is bound to the Dako-Sum henge.

Robotus
Robotus is Eric's guardian. He is a robot like guardian and has many gadgets and tools. He is a lot like Eric, and is able to fix a lot of things. Robotus is capable of transforming his body into multiple anatomies. Outside of battle, Robotus sometimes will appear in a small toy-like form, which often serves as a kind of comedy relief. Robutus is actually called Robinus in the dialogue once. He often attacks with laser cannons or a laser machine-gun attack called Rivet Blast. Robotus' stone is bound to the Ogama sigil (engraved on his chest) although Robotus is seen with a different sigil on rare occasions, similar to Seth's booster stones. Strangely enough, in Episode 6 "Cast-aways", the henge on Robotus' stone is an Ogama-Nega henge which looks exactly like the Nova Stone's henge.

Sliver
Sliver is Snare's guardian. Its appearance is a medium-sized, cute, mouse-like creature. However, if a non-life-threatening attack harms it, it shows its true power: It divides itself into multiple copies, each with the same power as the original. If attacked enough, it can eventually get to a point where a herd of Sliver is spawned, easily capable of overpowering any opponent with its sheer numbers. Each Sliver (original or copy) attacks with its sharp teeth aggressively.

Sliver is the smallest known guardian besides Draykor. Its stone is bound to the Sum sigil, which is engraved on its forehead.

Taurius
Taurius is Lady K'Tahsh's guardian. A large bull wearing plate armor on its head and parts of its body. K'Tahsh uses it as a mount in battle. It has the Dako sigil engraved on its head and the armor parts.

Tormentor
Tormentor is Doku's guardian. It appears as a giant red-skinned demon with some mechanical body parts, like his rock whip arms. It has no legs as it slithers on a tail. It attacks enemies with its body, energy blasts from its mouth and whips the ground or enemies with its rock arms.

Tormentor's stone is bound to the henge of Dako and Nega (Dako is between Nega's bar and bolt going vertical, and his henge is engraved nowhere on his body).

Unidentified Possible Guardian
When the defenders discover the Ogama Pure Stone in an underwater temple, Kara claims that she can hear the roars of a monster. Sure enough, a massive turtle-like monster appears from a nearby grotto. It has a dark green body, a large shell covering its back and four large legs. The creature may be a guardian, possibly left by a Gadashin Monk who hid  the Pure Stone in the temple to guard the place from intruders. What suggests that this creature is a guardian is that it has the Yan sigil engraved on its legs and shell and the Nega sigil is present on its back. The beast could very well be bound to these sigils.

Vanathos
V-moth's evolved form used by Kali as Kara, now encased into a red guardian stone. It is a large, red insectoid guardian capable of flight. It also has electrical attacks V-Moth did. Vanathos also possesses some reptilian features such as green osteoderms, a plated underside and sharp teeth at the front of its mouth. Vanathos also has small clawed arms and a large bulky head. The only catch is it is able to manifest itself into a creature or being and can summon from the inside the host. Once it does this, the host is lost and Vanathos takes its place. It is still bound to the Yin sigil and it is engraved on its forehead.

Vemoth
Vemoth is Kara's guardian. Although the name "Vemoth" suggests that she is a moth, she actually resembles a wasp. She is the second-smallest guardian among the Defenders, the smallest being Draykor. Vemoth is capable of firing an energy shot from her stinger (Sonic Sting). When her wings are cut off, they can regenerate when Vemoth is re-summoned. Vemoth can also turn into a smaller version of itself, similar to Robotus and Kragus, but this form is used for spying or scouting. Vemoth's stone is bound to the Yin sigil (engraved on her forehead).

Voltanis
King Magnun's guardian. Long ago, Magnun fused with his guardian, but the aftereffects drove the king crazy, creating Infinimora. Voltanis was destroyed because his master was imprisoned in his own Guardian stone by Kara, Mel, and Flinch. With the stone occupied, Voltanis got banished from the stone and could no longer exist.

Voltanis is capable of firing bandages at others, incredible strength and spits acid. Voltanis seems a lot bulkier when fused with Magnun but when separated, the guardian is like a skeleton/mummy.

Voltanis's stone is bound to a henge of Yin and Ogama (Yin's top ends cut through Ogama via the left and right middle.  This henge is not engraved on Voltanis or Infinimora). This stone was then destroyed by Nazmul after he communicated with Magnun.

Yanaroth
The monster guarding Brim during his confinement on a remote island. The Yanaroth is identical to the Doomhunter besides the fact that it has a green shell instead of a gray one, its body is purple, and the stone on the end of its tail is strangely identical to V-Moth's guardian stone (having the Yin sigil engraved on it and being completely green). Mel is swallowed by the Yanaroth but manages to destroy it from the inside.

Yan-SH-ion
Little is known about this guardian. There was a contest on http://www.teletoon.com/ in which a guardian could be created and named from a selection of body parts and names. Yan-SH-ion was the winning guardian. It resembles a minotaur, having a bull's head and a humanoid body. Yan-SH-ion is also covered in white fur and grey rock plating. It has the power to sustain powerful blue orbs of energy and launch them at enemies. A video featuring the guardian depicts Brim being pursued by Mortagarian robots at Mount Froza. He binds Yan-SH-ion to a blank stone, which becomes green and now bears a red Dako-Infinus henge (with Dako in the center of Infinus). Brim escapes with the help of the guardian.

Yin-Icorn
This guardian is bound to the Yin sigil. Yes, it does have its own guardian stone, but it is not featured in the show. Greg Collinson did say that Yin-Icorn will be in a Di-Gata Defenders booster pack. Soon, Adam will attain it, and combine it with Firefox to create an unnamed guardian. It bears the sigils Yin and Infinis, but does not look like Flinch's "Yinfinis" symbol.

Trivia 

 Melosa's Pilot Clothing (or Melosa's Trailer Clothing) is a popular and common animation oddity seen throughout the series. In the first three episodes, her blue dress that covers her overalls is different from that of the recent episodes. In the old design, the Di-Gata henge was engraved on a cover over her left breast. And the dress itself was a wrap, with a dark blue lining going down underneath the cover, much like a robe or kimono. Afterwards, the cover and wrap line were removed and it became a full blue dress. Some spell (examples like Frost Blast and Crystal Casket) and older Draykor summonings used in the Pilot episodes got mixed into the later episodes. This conflicted with Melosa's appearance and became an animation oddity. This oddity is more popular in Season I than it is in Season II.
 In the episode "What Lies Beneath", Ronny, aka "Gator Boy", from "Ms. Fortune" can be found in the background of two scenes when the Defenders enter Arboth. He doesn't say anything in either scene.
 In the episode "Mel on My Mind", a petlike creature of Roodu and Azura spray a pink toxin that makes the person fall in love with the first person they see. Brackus and Rion both fall in love with Mel, while Mel falls in love with herself. This is also sprayed in Seth's eyes, but this has no effect on him. Brackus says this is because he is already in love with Mel. This is a reference to the flower juice from A Midsummer Night's Dream, a play by William Shakespeare, a comical story of lovers being mixed up, something that is very present in the episode "Mel on My Mind".
 Some guardians and/or characters have sigils within their henges that the stone caster has not mastered or does not use when casting spells (e.g.: Seth being able to summon Omnikragg without any of his spells involving the Altas sigil or Malco's chestplate bearing the Altas-Infinis henge when his spells don't use either sigil).
 Von Faustien is an Ethos hunter found in the episode Von Faustien. His name and occupation are a play on Abraham Van Helsing, a professor/vampire slayer found within the Dracula universe, written by Bram Stoker.
 Lady K'tahsh, a servant of the Ethos almost has the appearance and innate powers equal to Drow Elves, a sub-race of elves found in the Dungeons & Dragons series. Greg Collinson himself has also stated that Lady K'tahsh's character was inspired by the Night Elves, which originate from the Warcraft series.
 Malco, Flinch and Snare are the only adults that use the Yin sigil in their spells (and also for evil purposes). Which is ironic because it is the Sigil of Youth. The others are either children or teenagers. Examples in the young age group are Rion, Kara, and Adam.
 Adam and Kid Cole are the only two characters that use three sigils in their spells.  Adam uses Yin, Yan, and Infinis and Kid Cole uses Dako, Nega, and Yin.
 Kid Cole is the only character whose sigils are composed of combinations other characters use:
{| class="wikitable"
|-
! Character
! Dako
! Nega
! Yin
|-
| Kid Cole
| 
| 
| 
|-
| Seth
| 
| 
| 
|-
| Malco and Dark Malco
| 
| 
| 
|-
| Rion
| 
| 
| 
|}

 Most people working for the Order of Infinis have mastered the Infinis sigil; the only exception to this is Malco.
 Adam, Doku, and Bo are the only stone casters that specialize in sigils that are the opposites of each other. Adam uses Yin (Youth) and Yan (Wisdom), while Doku and Bo use Dako (Chaos) and Ogama (Order).
 Snare is the only character that uses the Sum sigil for evil purposes.
 Kara is the only character seen in the series that uses the Altas sigil in Di-Gata stone form. This makes Altas the least used sigil amongst the stone casters in this series.
 Dako is the most frequently used sigil amongst the stone casters in this series. It is used by 8 people and a race: Seth (Dako with Nega), Kali (as Kara, Dako with Altas), Bo and Doku (Dako with Ogama), Brackus (Dako with Infinis), Malco and Dark Malco (Dako with Yin), Kid Cole (Dako with Nega and Yin), Finn (Dako with Sum), and the Zad (Dako with Ethos).  This also means Dako is the sigil using almost all possible combinations in terms of stone casters.
 Anaconduit, Darkviper, Yan-SH-ion, and Tormentor are the only three guardians whose henges on their stones are not engraved anywhere on their bodies.
 Anaconduit is the only guardian that has the Megalith's henge engraved on its forehead in place of the henge on its stone.
 Darkviper and Omniaxor are the only guardians to have been summoned by more than one stone caster.  However, Darkviper has been summoned by more than one on-screen caster.
 In the opening sequence of the first season's episodes, the four main Defenders are shown summoning their stones; however, the sigils shown with them are not the ones they actually use:

{| class="wikitable"
|-
! Character
! Their Sigils
! What they summoned
|-
| Seth
| Nega, Dako
| Nega, Infinis
|-
| Melosa
| Sum, Yan
| Sum, Altas
|-
| Kara
| Yin, Altas
| Yin, Yan
|-
| Erik
| Ogama, Infinis
| Ogama, Dako
|-
| Rion
| Nega, Yin
| Nega, Altas
|}

Child superheroes
Lists of characters in Canadian television animation